Shehu Mustafa Ibn Umar El-Kanemi (son of Shehu Umar Ibn Muhammad of Borno) was the Shehu of Borno from 1974 to 2009.

Reign
Mustapha El-Kanemi was born in 1924, fourth son of the 17th Shehu of Borno, Sir Umar ibn Mohammed El-Kanemi, and was brought up in Dikwa, Borno State.
He became secretary to the Wali of Borno in 1945, and subsequently worked in different departments of the Native Authority as the representative of the Shehu.
In 1952 he attended the Ahmadu Bello University, Zaria where he studied Public Administration.

El-Kanemi was elected to the Northern Region House of Assembly in 1956, representing the Damaturu/Busari Constituency, and was re-elected in 1959. He was parliamentary secretary in the Northern Region during the Nigerian First Republic. 
He returned to Maiduguri in 1966 and in 1970 was made district head.
He was appointed Shehu of Borno in 1974.
At one time he was vice president of the Supreme Council for Islamic Affairs.
He was succeeded by Abubakar Ibn Umar Garbai El-Kanemi of Borno from the related family of the Dikwa Emirate.

Footnotes

Bibliography
Short biography of Mustafa Ibn Umar El-Kanemi of Borno
Article about the death of the Shehu of Borno

Dynasty

External links
Kanuri Studies Association

Royalty of Borno
1924 births
2009 deaths
Ahmadu Bello University alumni